Ceroplesis thunbergii is a species of beetle in the family Cerambycidae. It was described by Fahraeus in 1872. It is known from Kenya and Tanzania.

References

thunbergii
Beetles described in 1872